Castelnavia is a genus of flowering plants belonging to the family Podostemaceae.

Its native range is Brazil.

Species:

Castelnavia cuneifolia 
Castelnavia fimbriata 
Castelnavia fluitans 
Castelnavia lindmaniana 
Castelnavia monandra 
Castelnavia multipartita 
Castelnavia noveloi 
Castelnavia orthocarpa 
Castelnavia pendulosa 
Castelnavia princeps 
Castelnavia pusillina 
Castelnavia serpens

References

Podostemaceae
Malpighiales genera